This is a list of the first minority male lawyer(s) and judge(s) in Ohio. It includes the year in which the men were admitted to practice law (in parentheses). Also included are men who achieved other distinctions such becoming the first in their state to graduate from law school or become a political figure.

Firsts in Ohio's history

Lawyers 

 First African American male: John Mercer Langston (1854) 
 First Somali-born male: Ismail Mohamad (2017)

State judges 

 First African American: Perry B. Jackson (1922) in 1942 
 First African American male (common pleas): Charles W. White in 1955  
 First African American male elected (common pleas): Robert V. Franklin, Jr. in 1968 
 First African American male (Ohio Supreme Court): Robert Morton Duncan (1952) in 1969  
 First Latino American male (reputed): Joseph Flores (1964) in 1981 
 First Jewish American male (Chief Justice; Ohio Supreme Court): Eric Brown (1979) from 2010-2011

Federal judges 
 First African American male (U.S. Court of Military Appeals): Robert Morton Duncan (1952) in 1971  
 First Greek American male (United States District Court for the Northern District of Ohio): Thomas Demetrios Lambros in 1967
 First African American male (U.S. District Court for the Northern District of Ohio): George Washington White (1955) in 1980 
 First Greek American male (Chief Judge; United States District Court for the Northern District of Ohio): Thomas Demetrios Lambros in 1990
 First African American male (Chief Judge; U.S. District Court for the Northern District of Ohio): George Washington White (1955) in 1995

Assistant U.S. Attorney 

 First African American male (Northern District of Ohio): Nathaniel R. Jones (1957) in 1962

Ohio State Bar Association 

 First African American male president: John A. Howard from 1981-1982

Firsts in local history 

 Athornia Steele: First African American male to serve as the Dean of Capital University Law School (2003) [Delaware, Fairfield, and Franklin Counties, Ohio]
 Andrew Jackson Davison: First African American male lawyer in Athens County, Ohio
 Vincent Zottarelli and Benjamin D. Nicola: First Italian American male lawyers in Cleveland, Ohio [Cuyahoga County, Ohio]
 Frank D. Celebrezze: First Italian American male judge in Cleveland, Ohio (1937) [Cuyahoga County, Ohio]
 John Francis: First African American male to serve as the City Attorney for Columbus, Ohio (c. 1977)
 Robert Morton Duncan (1952): First African American male elected to serve in a judicial office in Franklin County, Ohio
 William L. Mallory (1986): First African American male to serve as a Judge of the Hamilton County First District Court of Appeals of Ohio
 John A. Howard:  First African American male elected as a judge in Lorain County (Elyria Municipal Court 1984 to 1999) after serving as the first African American President of the Ohio State Bar Association (1981-1982).
 Gustalo Nunez: First Hispanic American male judge in Lorain County, Ohio
 Robert V. Franklin, Jr.: First African American male to serve as a Judge of the Toledo Municipal Court (1960) and later the Lucas County Common Pleas Court (1968)
 Robert A. Pinn (1879): First African American lawyer in Massillon County, Ohio and Stark County, Ohio
 Moses H. Jones: First African American male lawyer in Dayton, Montgomery County, Ohio
 Arthur Fisher: First African American male elected as a Judge of the Common Pleas Court (Domestic Relations) in Montgomery County, Ohio
 Gerald Parker: First African American male to serve as a Judge of the Montgomery County Common Pleas Court General Division, Ohio
 Jeff Payton: First African American male judge in Richland County, Ohio
 Robert A. Pinn (1879): First African American lawyer in Massillon County, Ohio and Stark County, Ohio
 Clay E. Hunter: First African American male judge in Stark County, Ohio (upon his appointment to the Canton Municipal Court in 1962)
 Kyle L. Stone (2021): First African-American elected prosecutor in Stark County, Ohio
 Joseph D. Roulhac: First African American male judge in Akron, Ohio (Summit County, Ohio; 1967). He was also the first African American Assistant Summit County Prosecutor.
 Isaac C. Hunt, Jr: First African American male to serve as the Dean of University of Akron School of Law (1987)

See also 

 List of first minority male lawyers and judges in the United States

Other topics of interest 

 List of first women lawyers and judges in the United States
 List of first women lawyers and judges in Ohio

References 

 
Minority, Ohio, first
Minority, Ohio, first
Legal history of Ohio
Lists of people from Ohio
Ohio lawyers